Jirayu La-ongmanee (born 29 October 1995), nicknamed Kao, is a Thai actor and singer. He has starred in several Thai films and TV dramas, and has done advertising and modelling work as well.

Early life and education
La-ongmanee was born in Rayong and moved to Bangkok when he was 3-month-old with his mother, Woranuch La-ongmanee. He went to Amatyakul School and entered the entertainment industry at the age of five. La-ongmanee graduated with a bachelor’s degree from the College of Social Communication Innovation, Srinakharinwirot University and a master’s degree from the School of Communication Arts, Sripatum University.

Career
La-ongmanee began acting in several television soap operas (lakorn), becoming widely noted for his role as Santi in 2005 Fa Krachang Dao. He was then invited to try for a cinematic role in King Naresuan, in which he played the role of young Boonthing. He has since acted in four other films and has numerous television, advertising and modelling work.

La-ongmanee gained popularity after he starred in 2011 Thai comedy film, SuckSeed. He won Daradaiy The GREAT Awards 2011 Best Actor for the role. After his success from SuckSeed, in 2012 La-ongmanee starred opposite Nattasha Nauljam in a short movie "Just a Second" and Sutatta Udomsilp in a romantic film, Seven Something, directed by Jira Maligool, Adisorn Trisirikasem and Paween Purikitpanya. He won the 29th Saraswati Royal Awards Best Supporting Actor for the film.

In 2016, he played a lead role in "O-Negative, Love can't be designed".

Due to the popularity of La-ongmanee in Indonesia, he has promoted his movies in Indonesia twice, in 2014 for Chiang Khan Story and in 2015 for Joe Hua Tang Mo.

La-ongmanee started his musical career again by forming a band called "SLEEPRUNWAY BAND" in 2015, he was a vocal and guitarist. They released a single entitled "SLEEPRUNWAY".  In 2016, he released a new single, "Thuk Yang Man Plian Pai Laew" (Everything has changed).

Filmography

TV series

Endorsements

Concerts

Discography
 Deep in my heart (Acoustic) Ost. SuckSeed
 Just A Second
 But do not tell me much (Music Club Friday The Series one time in my memory ... I do not).
 What better way to Ost. Last Summer
 I love the original (album Project Love Pill 2 by Fongbeer).
 SLEEPRUNWAY : Jirayu La-ongmanee x SLEEP RUNWAY BAND
 It changed everything: Jirayu La-ongmanee x SLEEP RUNWAY BAND
 Diary : Jirayu La-ongmanee x SLEEP RUNWAY BAND

Music video
 The man who killed me - Dome Pakorn Lum (OST.5 junction).
 Sugar Eyes - Sugar Buckeyes
 Up - Jida
 Wink - Orange Marine
 I do not like my friends - Orange Marine
 Deep in my heart - Big Ass ( OST.SuckSeed ).
 I like tonight - Frog Taxi
 Number two - Britney Sants Bhirombhakdi.
 I would not be afraid regrets - David Archuleta (OST. Seven Something).

MC
 Television 
 20 : On Air 

 Online 
 2022 : POKE 9 EP.1 : ศึกลิงตัดลิง On Air YouTube:Kao Jirayu

Awards

References

External links
 
 https://www.instagram.com/kaojirayu_9
 https://www.facebook.com/Kaojirayuofficial/

Jirayu La-ongmanee
Jirayu La-ongmanee
Jirayu La-ongmanee
Jirayu La-ongmanee
Jirayu La-ongmanee
1995 births
Living people
Jirayu La-ongmanee
Male soap opera actors
Jirayu La-ongmanee
Jirayu La-ongmanee
Jirayu La-ongmanee
Jirayu La-ongmanee
Jirayu La-ongmanee
Jirayu La-ongmanee